The Sinhŭng Line is an electrified  narrow gauge railway line of the Korean State Railway in South Hamgyŏng Province, North Korea, running from Hamhŭng (Hamhŭng-si) to Pujŏnhoban (Pujŏn-gun) on Lake Pujŏn via Sinhŭng (Sinhŭng-gun).

Though primarily an industrial railway connecting to the Pujŏn River hydroelectric power plant, it also plays an important role in passenger transportation in the region. There is a  section between Songhŭng and Pujŏllyŏng that is cable-hauled.

History

During the Japanese colonial era, the privately owned Sinhŭng Railway built a network of narrow-gauge lines north of Hamhŭng. These were the Hamnam Line (not to be confused with the line of the same name of the Chosen Magnesite Development Railway, nowadays called Kŭmgol Line), to assist in the construction of the Pujŏn River hydroelectric power plant and to exploit forestry and other resources in the area. When complete, the Hamnam Line ran from Hamhŭng to Hamnam Sinhŭng (nowadays called simply Sinhŭng) via Oro (nowadays Yŏnggwang), with a branch from Oro to Sang'tong. Later, the Sinhŭng Railway opened the Songhŭng Line from Sinhŭng to Pujŏnhoban. The Sinhŭng Railway was bought by the Chosen Railway on 22 April 1938.

Between 1934 and 1936, the Sinhŭng Railway opened a line south from Hamhŭng, the Namhŭng Line.

After the establishment of the DPRK and the nationalisation of its railways, the Hamnam Line was split up, with the Hamhŭng - Oro - Sinhŭng section becoming the Sinhŭng Line, and the Oro - Sangt'ong section becoming part of the Changjin Line. At the same time, the Songhŭng Line was merged into the Sinhŭng Line, extending it to its current length. Originally built entirely as a narrow gauge line, frequent accidents on the line led the Korean State Railway to convert the Hamhŭng—Sinhŭng to standard gauge for greater safety and increased transportation capacity. After the regauging of this section, West Hamhŭng station was disconnected from the Hamhŭng—Sinhŭng, leaving Hamhŭng as the only direct junction point with the Sŏho Line. Electrification of the line to Pujŏnhoban was completed in 1992.

Services

Freight
The primary outbound freight shipped on the Sinhŭng Line is wood; potatoes and metals are also shipped out. Goods arriving onto the line from elsewhere include coal (anthracite and bituminous), fertiliser, aquatic products, grains and cement.

Passenger

Though primarily an industrial railway connecting to the Pujŏn River hydroelectric power plant, it also plays an important role in passenger transportation in the region. A pair of local passenger trains, 880/881, operate on the standard gauge section of this line between Hamhŭng and Sinhŭng; there are also passenger trains on the narrow-gauge section north of Sinhŭng.

Route
A yellow background in the "Distance" box indicates that section of the line is not electrified; a pink background indicates that section is  narrow gauge; an orange background indicates that section is non-electrified narrow gauge.

References

 

Railway lines in North Korea
Standard gauge railways in North Korea
2 ft 6 in gauge railways in North Korea